The 2001 24 Hours of Le Mans was the 69th Grand Prix of Endurance, and took place on 16 and 17 June 2001.

Background

Preview 
The 2001 24 Hours of Le Mans was the 69th edition of the race and took place at the  Circuit de la Sarthe road racing circuit close by Le Mans, France from 16 to 17 June. The race was first held in 1923 after the automotive journalist Charles Faroux, the Automobile Club de l'Ouest (ACO) general secretary Georges Durand and the industrialist Emile Coquile agreed to hold a test of vehicle reliability and durability. It is considered the world's most prestigious sports car race and is part of the Triple Crown of Motorsport.

Track and regulation changes 
Work in the area costing almost F6.5 million was mandated by motor racing's governing body, the Fédération Internationale de l'Automobile (FIA), to comply with road safety regulations and traffic using the area was diverted onto an alternate route. Other changes included a widening of the run-off area to the outside on the approach to the right-hand Indianapolis corner and a gravel trap and spectator section was moved further back in an attempt to enhance safety.

The ACO allowed cars in the Le Mans Prototype 675 (LMP675) category to be installed with a V6 turbocharged engine with a maximum capacity of  up from a V4 power unit in the 2000 event. Teams could also fit a V8 engine into a car in the event that it was normally aspirated. The governing body also revoked a regulation for a car's headlights to be switched on in daylight hours and the FIA would supervise laboratory crash tests conducted on all vehicles. Changes to the format of the weekend saw the test day have 48 cars and 6 reserves all driving together in lieu of individual sessions for Grand Touring and Prototypes and would not eliminate any cars from contention as seen in previous editions of the race.

Entries
The ACO received 80 "good quality" inquires for applications by the deadline for entries on the midnight of 28 February 2001. The ACO's eight-person selection committee granted 48 invitations to the 24 Hours of Le Mans in-late March. Entries were divided between the Le Mans Prototype 900 (LMP900), Le Mans Grand Touring Prototype (LMGTP), LMP675, Le Mans Grand Touring Sport (LMGTS) and Le Mans Grand Touring (LMGT) categories.

Automatic entries 

Automatic entries were earned by teams which won their class in the 2000 24 Hours of Le Mans, or have won Le Mans-based series and events such as the 2000 Petit Le Mans of the American Le Mans Series, the Race of a Thousand Years held as part of the Asian-Pacific Le Mans Series and the 2000 1000 km of Nürburgring of the European Le Mans Series. As entries were pre-selected to teams, they were restricted to a maximum of two cars and were not allowed to change their vehicles nor their competitors' licence from the previous year to the next. Entries were permitted to change category provided that they did not change the make of vehicle and the ACO granted official permission for the switch.

The ACO published its final list of automatic berths on 26 January 2001. Audi Sport North America, Viper Team Oreca and Dick Barbour Racing were the three teams out of the twelve that were pre-selected to decline their automatic invitations.

1. – Team declined their automatic invitations.

Entry list and reserves 
The ACO announced the full 48-car entry list for Le Mans plus six reserves on 4 April. The Ascari, Audi, Bentley, Cadillac, Courage, Chrysler, Dome and Panoz brands were accepted into the two Prototype classes, which featured a mixture of works teams and privateers. Cars from Lola, Pilbeam and Reynard featured in the eight-vehicle LMP675 class. Chrysler, General Motors via its Chevrolet division and Saleen were the three manufacturers in the LMGTS category. The majority of cars in the LMGT class were from Porsche with Callaway represented by one team. On 27 April, the No. 59 Saleen/Allen Speedlab-entered S7 was withdrawn from the race. The No. 21 Team Ascari car was promoted from the top of the list of reserves to take the vacated slot on the grid.

Testing 

A mandatory pre-Le Mans test day split into two daytime sessions of four hours each was held at the circuit on 6 May, involving all 48 cars and four reserve entries. The morning session was led by Audi with a lap of 3 minutes, 36.054 seconds from Stefan Johansson in the No. 4 Johansson Motorsport R8. The top-placed works Audi was Tom Kristensen's No. 1 Team Joest car in second and the fastest Bentley EXP Speed 8 was the No. 7 of Stéphane Ortelli in third. Emanuele Pirro of Team Joest, Johnny Herbert for Champion Racing and Yannick Dalmas in a Chrysler LMP occupied fourth to sixth positions. A broken exhaust header caused the carbon fibre chassis on David Brabham's Panoz LMP07 to catch fire in the final moments of the morning session. Panoz withdrew the No. 12 car for the rest of the test day due to extensive damage it sustained. Eric van de Poele for Dick Barbour set the fastest lap in the LMP675 category, while the Larbre Compétition team led both GT classes with the No. 58 Oreca Viper and the No. 60 Porsche. Several drivers ran off the circuit during the session. Kristensen damaged the No. 2 Audi's front-right and the car's suspension arm was replaced. The No. 64 Corvette's steering failed and the car was stopped on the Mulsanne Straight.

The second test session had Audi continue to lead with Rinaldo Capello in the No. 2 car with the day's fastest lap of 3 minutes, 32.742 seconds. This was followed by an improved time for the Champion Racing car of Ralf Kelleners in second and Martin Brundle in Bentley's No. 8 car in third. Racing for Holland was fourth courtesy of a lap from Jan Lammers and the second Joest Audi of Frank Biela rounded out the top five. The Dick Barbour team continued to lead the LMP675 category with an improved lap of 3 minutes, 44.272 seconds, ahead of the trio of drivers of the second-placed No. 38 ROC Auto Reynard 01Q and Claudia Hurtgen's No. 32 Roock/KnightHawk Racing Lola B2K/40-Nissan in third. Oliver Gavin moved the No. 60 Saleen Allen Speedlab S7R to the head of LMGTS with a lap of 3 minutes, 54.344 seconds. He was followed by Johnny Mowlem's No. 62 Ray Mallock car on the soft compound tyres and Corvette's No. 63 C5-R was third-fastest in the session. Xavier Pompidou in the No. 73 Freisinger Motorsport Porsche led the LMGT class with the No. 80 Larbre car second. Fabio Babini's No. 83 Seikel Motorsport car and the No. 35 Rowan Racing Pilbeam MP84-Nissan made contact at the Ford Chicane late in the session and the former was unable to continue driving.

Qualifying

There were eight hours of qualifying divided into four two-hour sessions available to every entrants on 13 and 14 June. During the sessions, all entrants were required to set a time within 110 per cent of the fastest lap established by the fastest vehicle in each of the five categories to qualify for the race. The first session took place in clear weather conditions. Audi, the pre-race favourites, led early on with a flying lap from Kristensen before his teammate Capello followed with a 3 minutes, 34.880 seconds time to go fastest overall. Kristensen stood three-tenths of a second adrift in second. Lammers followed in third and Kelleners was fourth for Champion Racing. The fastest Bentley was in fifth position after a lap from Brundle. The No. 12 Panoz of Jan Magnussen stopped after the PlayStation chicane and was then sidelined with a blocked gearbox. Anthony Reid carried the No. 34 MG-Lola EX257-Lola to provisional pole position in the LMP675 category with a time of 3 minutes, 42.065 seconds ahead of the ROC Auto Reynard and No. 36 Dick Barbour entries. The crew of MG's No. 33 car set no laps because it suffered from an alternator issue that created a misfire. The GTS class of GT was led by Ron Fellows' No. 64 Corvette, who set a 3 minutes, 55.552 seconds lap. Andy Pilgrim in the sister No. 63 Corvette was second followed by Christophe Bouchut's No. 58 Larbre Oreca in third. At the conclusion of the session, the No. 80 Larbre Porsche led in LMGT from the No. 70 Aspen Knolls MCR Callaway C12-R and the No. 72 Team Taisan Advan car.

The day's fastest laps were predicted to possibly be set within the opening fifteen minutes of the second session due to lowering ambient temperatures and light levels. Kristensen improved provisional pole position to a 3 minutes, 32.458 seconds lap seven minutes into the session to be four seconds faster than Allan McNish's 2000 pole lap. He was unable to improve any further because of an electrical misfire that affected the No. 1 Audi. Capello fell to second; the No. 2 car had a power steering fault just as Christian Pescatori relieved his co-driver. Kelleners moved Champion Racing to third after a change of gearbox. Lammers of Racing for Holland fell to fourth and Brundle's No. 7 Bentley was demoted to fifth because a punctured tyre on the Mulsanne Straight sent him into the gravel trap at Mulsanne Corner. Reid MG's No. 34 car had a possible blocked fuel filter that regulated its fuel pressure; the car kept the class pole of LMP675. Kevin McGarrity elevated the sister No. 33 MG to second in class and ROC Auto fell to third. In LMGTS, Oliver Gavin's No. 60 Saleen led the session and took the provisional class pole position from Corvette Racing. Fellows crashed into a tyre barrier at the second Mulsanne Chicane and the No. 63 Corvette sustained heavy rear-end damage. He was unhurt. The sole non-Porsche car in LMGT of the Aspen Knolls MCR-entered Callaway C12 of Cort Wagner moved to the front in class with Patrice Goueslard's No. 80 Larbre car second.

Conditions were overcast for the third practice session on 14 June and some rain fell intermittently. None of the first three Audi teams improved their times from the day before as most teams focused on locating their racing setups. Lammers set the session's fastest lap at 3 minutes, 34.838 seconds to strengthen Racing for Holland's hold on fourth position and he moved to within half a second of Herbert's Champion Audi. Johanasson was second-quickest and his time moved the No. 4 Audi from eighth to fifth in the final ten minutes of the session. Jordi Gené set the fastest time in the LMP675 in the ROC Auto Reynard yet he was almost four seconds behind the class pole-sitting No. 34 MG. The LMGTS class remained the same upfront as Gavin improved the No. 60 Saleen's fastest lap time to a 3 minutes, 52.849 seconds and took a new class record. The No. 58 Larbre Oreca of Christophe Bouchut retained third place in category. The lead of LMGT changed when Goueslard's No. 80 Larbre entry took the category pole position late on before Wagner in the Aspen Knolls Callaway used his team's race engine to reclaim the position. Perspective Racing's Michel Neugarten went off the circuit and damaged the rear of the No. 75 Porsche at the PlayStation chicane. Luis Marques in the No. 74 Luc Alphand Adventure car leaked oil at the entry to the Michelin chicane due to a hose problem and marshals quickly cleaned the track. Noël del Bello's No. 79 vehicle of Georges Forgeois damaged its front-left in an accident.

As temperatures cooled in the final qualifying session due to fading light, Capello waited in his garage before he negotiated slower traffic to set a 3 minutes, 32.249 seconds lap in the No. 2 Audi and demoted Kristensen from pole position. Kristensen's No. 1 car had its damper unit and front bodywork changed and ran a race-tuned engine along with soft compound tyres; he could not better his teammate's lap because of a slow puncture when he ran into a gravel trap at the first Mulsanne Straight chicane, giving the No. 2 car pole position. Champion Racing were not able to improve their lap and took third. Lammers' third-session time secured Racing for Holland fourth and Johannson's No. 4 Audi took fifth. Anthony Reid twice reset the fastest lap in LMP675 to secure pole position for the No. 34 MG team with a 3 minutes, 41.769 seconds lap. Kevin McGarrity in the sister MG was second in class after an oil leak caused the team to change engines. Gené's ROC Auto entry took third in the category. The GT categories remained the same with the No. 60 Saleen's lap time set by Gavin giving it pole position in the GTS class and Wagner's lap in LMGT was not bettered by any other driver. Team Advan's No. 72 Porsche driven by Kazuyuki Nishizawa had an accident at the Porsche Curves and sustained damage to its front and rear.

Qualifying results
Pole position winners in each class are indicated in bold and by a  The fastest time set by each entry is denoted in gray.

Warm-up

The drivers took to the track at 09:00 local time on 16 June for a 45-minute warm-up session. It was held on a damp track after overnight rain; teams focused on systems checks, setting up their cars against the weather of the time, tried several tyre compounds and ensuring their drivers had some driving experience. The No. 2 Audi driven by Christian Pescatori set the fastest time with a lap of 3 minutes, 40.497 seconds. The sister No. 1 Joest Audi of Emanuele Pirro was second with the highest-placed Bentley in third with Guy Smith's No. 7 car. Sébastien Bourdais in Pescarolo Sport's No. 17 C60 was fourth-quickest and Éric Bernard's No. 5 DAMS Cadillac Northstar LMP fifth. The fastest LMP675 lap was set by the ROC Auto Reynard at 3 minutes, 51.491 seconds. RML's No. 62 Saleen was the fastest car in the LMGTS category and the Aspen Knolls MCR Callaway led in LMGT. The No. 11 Panoz of Klaus Graf had a tyre issue and went into the gravel trap at the exit to Indianapolis corner from which marshals extricated him. Corvette's No. 64 car stopped at the Dunlop Bridge with a broken oil pump belt and the No. 80 Larbre Porsche leaked oil from its underside due to a possible fuel system fault.

Race
220,000 people attended the event. Audi's top two finishers had to share the podium with a Bentley interloper, but their margin over third place was formidable.

Corvette Racing's achievement of a GTS class win was sullied by a slow pace and the presence of two GT class Porsche 911s in front of them.  It was the last time a Porsche team would finish in front of the GTS class until they had the class-consolidating 4.0 liter 997 GT3 RSR in their possession, in 2010.

Official results

 Distance – 4381.65 km
 Average Speed – 180.949 km/h
 Highest Trap Speed – Audi R8 – 318 km/h (race), Dome Judd S101 – 335 km/h (Practice)

References

Le Mans
24 Hours of Le Mans
24 Hours of Le Mans races
Le Mans